Takukot is a Ward of Barpak sulikot Rural Municipality in Gorkha District in the Gandaki Province of northern-central Nepal. At the time of the 1991 Nepal census it had a population of 4,234 and had 801 houses in the town.

Surya Jyoti Secondary School is situated at Takukot VDC, Ward No. 4, Palkhu. Primary Schools are established at every ward of the VDC. The main transit point for trading and other purposes is Palkhu Bazar. Mirco Hydro Power is implementing from the Hudi Khola as Hudi Khola Micro Hydro Project with the effort of Local peoples. Peoples of wards no. 1, 2, 3, 4, 5, and 6 are receiving advantages from hydroelectricity. Sub-Health Post is situated at Palkhu Bazar and the VDC Office is situated at Ward No. 1, Kotthok.

History of Takukot

People believed Takukot was ruled by Ghale King end of 15th century

See also

 Sulikot
 Ligligkot
 Saurpani
 Ghunchok

References

Populated places in Gorkha District